James Gallanders (born February 9, 1970) is a Canadian actor.  He studied at York University's Faculty of Fine Arts.

Career
Born in Scarborough, Ontario, Canada, Gallanders began appearing on several television series before receiving his first role in the feature film Murder at 1600.  In 1998 he appeared in three feature films, Reluctant Angel, the drama Babyface and the horror sequel Bride of Chucky, with Jennifer Tilly.  The following year, Gallanders received a small role in the Agnieszka Holland drama The Third Miracle, with Ed Harris and Anne Heche and Prisoner of Love, featuring Naomi Campbell.  In 2002, he portrayed 'Greg Sommers' in the direct-to-video sequel The Skulls II. He served as a voice artist in the horror film Saw II in 2005. In 2007, Gallanders portrayed the role of 'Major Brent Beardsly' in Shake Hands with the Devil, an award-winning historical war drama based on the Rwandan genocide.

Throughout his career, Gallanders has made a number of guest appearances on many television series.  In 1996, he made his acting debut in Due South.  From 1999 to 2000 he portrayed the role of 'Detective Michael Croft' in the short-lived CTV soap opera The City in which he had a recurring role. Many of Gallanders television credits include Millennium, La Femme Nikita, Mutant X, the American/Canadian version of Queer as Folk and Kevin Hill which only lasted one season.  His most recent television work was in the Emmy Award-winning mini-series The Kennedys.

Personal life
Gallanders married actress Stacie Mistysyn on August 29, 2009.

Filmography

References

External links
 

1970 births
Living people
Canadian male television actors
Canadian male film actors
Male actors from Toronto
People from Scarborough, Toronto